Haruka Abe is a Japanese actress.

Life and career 
Born in Nerima, Tokyo, Abe grew up in Tokyo, London and New York. She trained at Rose Bruford College in South East London.

She appeared in BBC's Ideal as Miko, and as Marti in Sleepydog's science-fiction TV series Slingers directed by Steve Barron. She also appeared in the video for Clean Bandit's song "Rather Be" which has gained over 713 million views on YouTube as of March 2023.

In 2018, she became the new speaking voice of Noodle from the virtual band Gorillaz.

Filmography

Television

Web series

Film

Music videos

Video games

References

External links
 
 
 

1985 births
Living people
Actresses from Tokyo
Alumni of Rose Bruford College
Japanese expatriates in the United Kingdom
Japanese film actresses
Japanese television actresses
People from Nerima